Woodland Joint Unified School District or WJUSD is a school district in Woodland, California. Established in July 1965, it now has a budget of over $111,200,000. The student population of the district was just over 10,500 in the 2018-2019 year. It contains: 11 elementary schools, one charter elementary school, two middle schools, two high schools, one continuation high school, and one adult education center.

Elementary schools
Beamer Park Elementary School
Dingle Elementary School
Freeman Elementary School
Gibson Elementary School
Rhoda Maxwell Elementary School
Plainfield Elementary School
Ramon S. Tafoya Elementary School
Spring Lake Elementary School
Whitehead Elementary School
Woodland Prairie Elementary School
Zamora Elementary School

Middle schools
Douglass Middle School
Lee Middle School

High schools
Pioneer High School
Woodland High School

Adult education
Woodland Adult Education

Charter schools
Science and Technology Academy in Knights Landing

References

External links
 

School districts in Yolo County, California
Woodland, California
School districts established in 1965
1965 establishments in California